The sixth edition of the Women's Asian Amateur Boxing Championships were held from March 19 to March 25, 2012 in Ulan Baatar, Mongolia.

Medalists

Medal table

References
amateur-boxing

Asian Amateur Boxing Championships